The 19th Golden Globe Awards, honoring the best in film and television for 1961, were held on March 5, 1962.

Winners and nominees

Film

Best Film - Drama
 The Guns of Navarone
 El Cid
 Fanny
 Judgment at Nuremberg
 Splendor in the Grass

Best Film - Comedy
 A Majority of One
 Breakfast at Tiffany's
 One, Two, Three
 The Parent Trap
 Pocketful of Miracles

Best Film - Musical
 West Side Story
 Babes in Toyland
 Flower Drum Song

Best Actor - Drama
 Maximilian Schell – Judgment at Nuremberg
 Warren Beatty – Splendor in the Grass
 Maurice Chevalier – Fanny
 Paul Newman – The Hustler
 Sidney Poitier – A Raisin in the Sun

Best Actress - Drama
 Geraldine Page – Summer and Smoke
 Leslie Caron – Fanny
 Shirley MacLaine – The Children's Hour
 Claudia McNeil – A Raisin in the Sun
 Natalie Wood – Splendor in the Grass

Best Actor - Comedy or Musical
 Glenn Ford – Pocketful of Miracles
 Fred Astaire – The Pleasure of His Company
 Richard Beymer – West Side Story
 Bob Hope – Bachelor in Paradise
 Fred MacMurray – The Absent-Minded Professor

Best Actress - Comedy or Musical
 Rosalind Russell – A Majority of One
 Bette Davis – Pocketful of Miracles
 Audrey Hepburn – Breakfast at Tiffany's
 Hayley Mills – The Parent Trap
 Miyoshi Umeki – Flower Drum Song

Best Supporting Actor
 George Chakiris – West Side Story 
 Montgomery Clift – Judgment at Nuremberg
 Jackie Gleason – The Hustler
 Tony Randall – Lover Come Back
 George C. Scott – The Hustler

Best Supporting Actress
 Rita Moreno – West Side Story
 Fay Bainter – The Children's Hour
 Judy Garland – Judgment at Nuremberg
 Lotte Lenya – The Roman Spring of Mrs. Stone
 Pamela Tiffin – One, Two, Three

Best Director
 Stanley Kramer – Judgment at Nuremberg
 Anthony Mann – El Cid
 Jerome Robbins and Robert Wise – West Side Story
 J. Lee Thompson – The Guns of Navarone
 William Wyler – The Children's Hour

Best Foreign Language Film
 Two Women (La ciociara) • Italy
 The Good Soldier Schweik (Der Brave Soldat Schwejk) • West Germany
 The Important Man (Ánimas Trujano: El hombre importante) • Mexico

Silver Globe
The Good Soldier Schweik (Der Brave Soldat Schwejk) (West Germany)
The Important Man (Ánimas Trujano: El hombre importante) (Mexico)

Best Music, Original Score
 "The Guns of Navarone" – Dimitri Tiomkin
 "El Cid" – Miklós Rózsa
 "Fanny" – Harold Rome
 "King of Kings" – Miklós Rózsa
 "Summer and Smoke" – Elmer Bernstein

Best Song
"Town Without Pity" - Town Without Pity (Dimitri Tiomkin - music, Ned Washington - lyrics)

Best Film Promoting International Understanding
A Majority of One
 Judgment at Nuremberg
 Bridge to the Sun

Most Promising Newcomer - Male
Warren Beatty
Richard Beymer
Bobby Darin
 George C. Scott

Most Promising Newcomer - Female
Ann-Margret
Jane Fonda
Christine Kaufmann
 Pamela Tiffin
 Cordula Trantow

Henrietta Award (World Film Favorite)
Charlton Heston
Marilyn Monroe

Television
Only winners announced

Best TV Show
 What's My Line?
 My Three Sons

Best TV Star - Male
 Bob Newhart
 John Daly

Best TV Star - Female
 Pauline Frederick

Special Journalistic Merit Award
Army Archerd (Daily Variety)
Mike Connolly (The Hollywood Reporter)

Special Merit Award
Samuel Bronston - El Cid

Samuel Goldwyn Award
 The Mark

Cecil B. DeMille Award
Judy Garland

Award breakdown

Film
Winners
3 / 3 A Majority of One: Best Actress-Musical or Comedy, Film-Comedy & Film Promoting International Understanding
3 / 5 West Side Story: Best Film-Musical & Supporting Actor and Actress
2 / 3 The Guns of Navarone: Best Film-Drama & Original Score
1 / 3 Summer and Smoke: Best Actress-Drama

References

IMdb 1962 Golden Globe Awards

19
1961 film awards
1961 television awards
1961 awards in the United States
March 1962 events in the United States